Uriah Duffy (31 July 1975, Wakefield, Rhode Island, United States) is an American bassist. He is best known as the former bassist of Whitesnake. He is currently the bassist of the California-based progressive rock band Points North.

An internationally endorsed musician, Uriah is known for his versatility, with chops ranging from Funk, R&B, Jazz, Hip-Hop, House, Rock, Metal and Gospel.

Has been a member of/played with

 Points North (2012 – present) – progressive rock
 Whitesnake (National and World Tours; 2 albums) – rock
Christina Aguilera (CD: Stripped, 2002) – R&B
Alicia Keys (Studio Recording, 2002) – R&B
Robert Stewart – various live dates from 1997 to 2016
Goaplé (CD: Closer, 2001) – R&B
Sly & the Family Stone (3rd bassist, 2003–2005) – funk
GQ (Various Dates) – funk/disco
Tony Toni Toné (Various Dates/TV) – R&B
Too $hort (Hometown oakland shows) – dirty rap
Lyrics Born (Regional and World Tours; TV appearances; Latest album) – rap/hip-hop/funk
Chris Clouse (Various live performances since 2002) Pat Travers/Carmine
Appice (2004 CD) – rock
Flametal (Current work) – flamenco/metal
The Coup (Shows and latest album) – rap/hip-hop
First A.M.E. Church, LA (2004) – gospel

Discography
 1998 - Rupert "Ojiji" Harvey - Once a Lion | Reggae
 1999 - Femmes Fatales - Same | R&B Diva Duet
 1999 - Spunjunket - HumansBeingSpun | Funk, rock, ska
 2000 - Sterling Williams - The Star Motel | Spoken word/poetry
 2001 - Sonia D. | R&B/acid jazz
 2001 - VaporRub - Take the Red Pill | Hard rock
 2001 - Ché - Ché | Adult contemporary
 2001 - Realistic - RealisticBigBand | Drum & bass
 2001 - Goapalé - Goapalé | R&B
 2002 - Baby Ray - In Yo' Face | Rap
 2002 - Trance Thompson - Hypnatic | Soulful rock
 2002 - Martin Luther - Rebel Soul Music | Soul, funk, rock
 2002 - SoulFolk - Brutha From Anutha Planet | Soul
 2002 - Resurrection Power - Live - Fullness of Joy| Gospel
 2002 - Gabriel Colbert - Gabriel Colbert | R&B
 2002 - Christina Aguilera - Stripped | R&B
 2002 - Sakai - Dream Big | R&B
 2003 - Chris Clouse - Trace Elements | Alt rock
 2003 - Krickie - Sweet Spell | Folk rock
 2003 - Kiff Gallagher - KG | R&B
 2003 - Danny Jones - Finding My Way | Guitar rock
 2004 - Jesse Brewster - Confessional | Songwriter
 2004 - Carmine Appice/Pat Travers- T'nA | Rock
 2004 - LaToya London | R&B (not released)
 2005 - Chris Catena | Rock (not released)
 2005 - Latrice Barnett | Illuminate | House
 2005 - Andy Caldwell | House trax
 2006 - Destani Wolf | Again and Again | RnB
 2006 - The Coup | Pick a Bigger Weapon | Rap
 2006 - Whitesnake | Live: In the Shadow of the Blues
 2008 - Lyrics Born | Everywhere at Once
 2008 - Whitesnake | Good to Be Bad
 2008 - Keno Mapp | Heart Touch
 2009 - Chris Catena Discovery | Escape Music
 2010 - Dr.U (Chris Catena) Alieni Alienati | Valery Records/Edel
 2015 - Points North | Points North
 2019 - Chris Catena Re-Discovery | IMR

References

External links
 Official website
 MySpace page

1975 births
Living people
People from Washington County, Rhode Island
Whitesnake members
21st-century American bass guitarists